Schuermans is a surname. Notable people with the surname include:

Alfred Schuermans, Belgian painter
Jens Schuermans (born 1993), Belgian mountain cyclist
Kenneth Schuermans (born 1991), Belgian footballer

See also
James T. Schuerman (born 1956), American Roman Catholic bishop